Juergen Egle is an Austrian para-alpine skier. He represented Austria in alpine skiing at four Winter Paralympics: in 1998, 2002, 2006 and 2010. In total he won one gold medal, three silver medals and two bronze medals.

Career 

In 1998 he won the gold medal in one alpine skiing event: the Men's Slalom LW11. In 2002 he won two silver medals: at the Men's Slalom LW11 event and at the Men's Giant Slalom LW11 event.

In 2006 he won two bronze medals: at the Men's Slalom Sitting event and at the Men's Giant Slalom Sitting event. He also competed in the Men's Super-G Sitting event where he finished 13th.

In 2010 he won the silver medal at the Men's Super Combined Sitting event.

He also won one gold medal and one bronze medal at the 2009 IPC Alpine Skiing World Championships.

Private life 
He also participated in Race Across America in 2006 and the Race Across Australia in 2010 with a handcycle.

See also 
 List of Paralympic medalists in alpine skiing

References 

Living people
Year of birth missing (living people)
Place of birth missing (living people)
Paralympic alpine skiers of Austria
Alpine skiers at the 1998 Winter Paralympics
Alpine skiers at the 2002 Winter Paralympics
Alpine skiers at the 2006 Winter Paralympics
Alpine skiers at the 2010 Winter Paralympics
Medalists at the 1998 Winter Paralympics
Medalists at the 2002 Winter Paralympics
Medalists at the 2006 Winter Paralympics
Medalists at the 2010 Winter Paralympics
Paralympic gold medalists for Austria
Paralympic silver medalists for Austria
Paralympic bronze medalists for Austria
Paralympic medalists in alpine skiing
20th-century Austrian people
21st-century Austrian people